The 46th World Cup season began on 22 October 2011, in Sölden, Austria, and concluded on 18 March 2012, at the World Cup finals in Schladming, Austria.

Two pre-Olympic races took place at Rosa Khutor, the alpine venue for the 2014 Winter Olympics in Sochi. Two city events, first held as a part of World Cup in the 2011 season, were scheduled for Munich and Moscow, but the Munich event was cancelled due to warm temperatures.

Lindsey Vonn won her fourth overall women's title in five years, clinching it with a giant slalom win on 9 March at Åre, Sweden. Vonn's title put her second on the all-time list behind Annemarie Moser-Pröll's tally of six titles. The men's overall title went to the final event at Schladming, where Austria's Marcel Hirscher prevailed over Switzerland's Beat Feuz.

Calendar

Men

Ladies

Nation team event

Men's standings

Overall

Downhill

Super-G

Giant slalom

Slalom

Super combined

Ladies' standings

Overall

Downhill

Super-G

Giant slalom

Slalom

Super combined

Nations Cup

Overall

Men

Ladies

Footnotes

References

External links

 
Alpine Skiing
FIS Alpine Ski World Cup
World Cup
World Cup